Ormosia travancorica is a species of flowering plant in the family Fabaceae.

It is endemic to the Western Ghats of Karnataka, Kerala and Tamil Nadu. It is reasonably common in the South Sahyadri and rare in the Coorg Region of Central Sahyadri. The canopy trees in wet evergreen forests, which generally extend up to 800 m, sometimes extend up to 1200 m in the southern Ghats.

References

External links
indiabiodiversity site which is having Creative Commons Licenses
online Herbarium Specimen-jstor.org
 Online digital book pages list biodiversitylibrary one of the page + its OCR data

travancorica
Flora of Karnataka
Flora of Kerala
Flora of Tamil Nadu